Acalyptris scirpi is a moth of the family Nepticulidae. It is found in Utah, United States.

The larvae feed on Scirpus paludosus. They mine the leaves of their host plant.

External links
New Leaf-Mining Moths of the Family Nepticulidae from Florida

Nepticulidae
Endemic fauna of Utah
Moths of North America
Moths described in 1925